Naka-ku (中区) is a common ward name in many Japanese cities.

 Naka-ku, Hamamatsu, Shizuoka Prefecture
 Naka-ku, Hiroshima, Hiroshima Prefecture
 Naka-ku, Nagoya, Aichi Prefecture
 Naka-ku, Okayama, Okayama Prefecture
 Naka-ku, Sakai, Osaka Prefecture
 Naka-ku, Yokohama, Kanagawa Prefecture

See also
Chūō-ku (disambiguation)
Jung District, similar place name in Korean cities